Harvey Miller may refer to:

People
 Harvey Alfred Miller (1928–2020), American botanist
 Harvey R. Miller (1933–2015), New York lawyer
 Harvey Miller (publisher) (1925–2008), British publisher
Harvey Miller Publishers, founded by Miller and now an imprint of Brepols
 Harvey Miller (screenwriter), American actor, director, producer and screenwriter

Characters
 Harvey Miller, a character from the TV show Baywatch played by Tom McTigue
 Harvey Miller, Jr, the main character of the film The Caddy

Other uses
 SS Harvey C. Miller, a Liberty ship, see List of Liberty ships: G-Je

See also
 Keith Harvey Miller (born 1925), former governor of Alaska

Miller, Harvey